The Marty Sheargold Show  is an Australian breakfast radio show on Triple M. The show is hosted by Marty Sheargold with anchor Troy Ellis. A one-hour highlights package airs nationally at 3pm across the Triple M Network. The show commenced on 18 January 2021.

History
In November 2020, Southern Cross Austereo announced that The Marty Sheargold Show  would replace The Hot Breakfast in 2021 after Eddie McGuire and Luke Darcy decided to end the show at the end of 2020 after 11 years. Sheargold was part of Nova's national drive show, Kate, Tim & Marty until September 2020 when he departed the show.

References

External links
The Marty Sheargold Show - Triple M

Australian radio comedy
Breakfast radio
2020s Australian radio programs
2021 establishments in Australia